Valea Orății River may refer to:

 Valea Orății, a tributary of the Prahova in Romania
 Valea Orății, a tributary of the Teleajen in Romania